Soultz-sous-Forêts is a commune in the Bas-Rhin department in Grand Est in north-eastern France.

It is the site of the European Hot Dry Rocks energy research project.

Notable people
 George Abert, member of the Wisconsin State Assembly

See also
 Communes of the Bas-Rhin department

References

 

Communes of Bas-Rhin
Bas-Rhin communes articles needing translation from French Wikipedia